The Balzi Rossi caves (Ligurian: baussi rossi "red rocks") in Ventimiglia comune, Liguria, Italy, is one of the most important archaeological sites of the early Upper Paleolithic in Western Europe.

Riparo Mochi remains, evidence for the earliest presence of modern humans in Europe (early Aurignacian,  42,000 years ago).
Grimaldi Man (Gravettian, c. 25,000 years)
Venus figurines of Balzi Rossi (Gravettian, c. 22,000 years)

References

Archaeological sites in Italy